Peter Quartey is a Ghanaian economist and the Director of the Institute of Statistical, Social and Economic Research of the University of Ghana, since 2019. He is a  professor of development economics at the University of Ghana.

Early life and education 
Quartey was born in Accra. He attended Wesley Grammar School and Accra Academy. Quartey received a B.A. and MPhil in economics from the University of Ghana in 1994 and 1996, respectively. Under an ODA Scholarship in 1996, Quartey moved to the University of Warwick to obtain a master's degree in Quantitative Development Economics. From 1998 to 2002, Quartey was enrolled at the University of Manchester for a doctorate degree in Development Economics.

Career
In 2003, he returned to Ghana and joined the Institute of Economic Affairs and later the Institute of Statistical, Social and Economic Research (ISSER), University of Ghana in 2004 as a research fellow. He was promoted to senior research fellow in 2008, to associate professor in May 2011 and professor in January 2016. Peter Quartey is currently a professor at the Institute of Statistical, Social and Economic Research (ISSER), the head of the Department of Economics and director of the Economic Policy Management Programme of the University of Ghana.

Research  
His research interests include private sector development, development finance, monetary economics, migration and remittances, and poverty analysis.

References

Alumni of the Accra Academy
University of Ghana alumni
Ga-Adangbe people
Living people
Year of birth missing (living people)